Oberthur Technologies was a French digital security company, providing secure technology solutions for Smart Transactions, Mobile Financial Services, Machine-to-Machine, Digital Identity and Transport & Access Control. As of 2008, Oberthur's revenue was €882 million.
Oberthur Technologies was the successor of the Oberthur printing which was founded in 1842 by the master printer and lithographer, François-Charles Oberthür.
Oberthur merged with Morpho to form IDEMIA on 28 September 2017.

History 
1842 Oberthur was founded by printer and lithographer François-Charles Oberthür

1984 Jean-Pierre Savare takes over security printing activity for François-Charles Oberthur Fiduciaire

1985 Creation of François-Charles Oberthur Card Systems

1990 Acquisition of Banknote of America Corporation

1991 Creation of François-Charles Oberthur Chèque et Sécurité

1993 Acquisition of Axytrans, France

1997 Creation of Oberthur Smart Cards

1999 Acquisition of De La Rue Card Systems and creation of Oberthur Card Systems

2000 Oberthur Card Systems IPO

2001 Opening factory in China

2001 Acquisition of Logica, Spain

2002 Acquisition of Rapsodia, France

2004 Opening of factory in Brazil

2005 Acquisition of Africard, SA

2006 Opening of factory in India

2006 Opening of software development center Oberthur Technologies Romania SRL in Bucharest which employs approximately 50 people

2007 Acquisition of I’M Technologies, Singapore

2007 Creation of Oberthur Technologies

2008 Acquisition of XPonCard, Sweden

2008 Delisting from the stock exchange

2011 Buy out of the Card Systems and Identity Division (Oberthur Technologies) to Advent International. The Secure Printing Division and Cash Protection are renamed Oberthur Fiduciaire and remained under the Savare family control.

2012 Acquisition of MoreMagic, a leading mobile money solution provider

2012 Acquisition of Cupola Plastic Cards in Dubai, a major smart card manufacturer and personalisation services provider for the Middle East

See also
Oberthur Cash Protection

References

External links 

 Oberthur Technologies

Publishing companies of France
Banknote printing companies
Companies based in Bourgogne-Franche-Comté
Defunct technology companies of France